Noah Graber (born 3 May 2001) is a Liechtenstein footballer who plays as a left winger for Eschen/Mauren and the Liechtenstein national team.

Career
Graber made his international debut for Liechtenstein on 11 November 2020 in a friendly match against Malta.

Career statistics

International

Personal life
He is the twin brother of Liechtenstein international player Lukas Graber.

References

External links
 
 

2001 births
Living people
People from Vaduz
Liechtenstein footballers
Liechtenstein youth international footballers
Liechtenstein under-21 international footballers
Liechtenstein international footballers
Liechtenstein expatriate footballers
Liechtenstein expatriate sportspeople in Switzerland
Expatriate footballers in Switzerland
Association football wingers
FC Vaduz players
USV Eschen/Mauren players